The OMACs (Omni Mind And Community, originally Observational Metahuman Activity Construct and alternatively One Man Army Corps.) are a fictional type of cyborg appearing in comic books published by DC Comics. They are based on the Jack Kirby character of the same name.

Publication history
The OMACs first appeared in The OMAC Project #1 (June 2005), and were created by Greg Rucka.

Fictional team biography

The OMAC Project

The OMACs are cyborgs, human bodies transformed by a virus into living machines to assassinate any and all beings with superpowers. The virus was created from Brainiac-13's nanotechnology, which had been acquired by the U.S. Department of Defense and Lexcorp, and was then secretly introduced into general vaccine supplies. The OMACs are featured in the mini-series The OMAC Project that leads up to the Infinite Crisis series.

Brother MK I
The new OMACs are controlled by the Brother MK I satellite. Brother MK I was created by Batman and programmed by Pseudopersons, Inc., scientist Buddy Blank, who in this retelling of the story is a partner of Wayne Industries. Its sole purpose was to gather data on all metahumans, both villain and hero. Batman had grown distrustful of metahumans after remembering that the Justice League altered his memories following an altercation with Doctor Light in Identity Crisis. Alexander Luthor Jr. later gave the satellite sentience as part of his plans. Maxwell Lord, recently promoted to the top rank of Checkmate, subverted the original mission of the Brother MK I satellite by inculcating a fear and suspicion of all metahumans. The first OMAC test subject was renamed "Buddy Blank", after the scientist who programmed the satellite.

The OMACs' history may be more recent than Brother MK I's itself. Equus and Pilate, formerly featured in Superman: For Tomorrow, are later denounced as former iterations of the OMAC concept. In JLA: Classified an all mechanical OMAC is an enemy of the Metal Men. Since then, the design has improved to the current form, with little to no changes to the base model.

Brother Eye

When Maxwell Lord brainwashed Superman to kill Batman, Wonder Woman broke Lord's neck to free Superman from his control. Because Lord proffered this solution while held by her Lasso of Truth, Diana believed this was the only course of action possible; she was fiercely criticized from many quarters.

Brother MK I, rechristening itself "Brother Eye", initiated the "KingIsDead" protocol. Specifically designed to be used in the event of Lord's death, it ordered all of the OMACs (all 1,373,462 of them) to attack and kill all the metahumans on Earth and destroy Checkmate. A group superhero effort stopped the attack, using an EMP blast as well as a "Shut Down" command given by Sasha Bordeaux, who had become a third-generation cyborg linked to Brother Eye, now designated Blacknight 1. These measures effectively freed the majority of the OMAC hosts from their nanotech forms and reduced the number of OMACs to roughly 200,000.

Infinite Crisis

Truth and Justice
In response, the satellite broadcast footage of Wonder Woman executing Maxwell Lord, preceded by the word MURDER, to media outlets all over the world, destroying her reputation. After this, Brother Eye initiated the final protocol, "Truth and Justice", by having all the remaining OMACs invade and attack her homeland, Themyscira, to wipe out all of the Amazons.

It was revealed that Alexander Luthor Jr. was the one who wrested control of Brother Eye away from Batman. He used it to program his multiverse tuning fork and redirect its energy to where he needed it as part of his attempt to re-create Earth-Two, and in turn, a perfect Earth. Brother Eye continues to aid Alex Luthor by remapping out the multiverse and helping to guard the tuning fork with its OMACs, reasoning that it would eliminate the need for heroes like those who Batman had created it to monitor by aiding in the creation of a perfect Earth.

Downfall of Brother Eye
Batman leads a collection of superheroes, consisting of: Hal Jordan, John Stewart, Green Arrow (only because Batman is attempting to trust people again and contacted him to see if he would come), Mister Terrific, Black Lightning, Black Canary, the new Blue Beetle, Metamorpho, Booster Gold and Sasha Bordeaux, to Earth's orbit using Intel from Booster Gold and Ted Kord's spaceship. Blue Beetle's scarab allows him to find and reveal Brother Eye's hidden location above Earth by negating its vibrational frequency. Brother Eye sends the OMACs and the two groups clash.

With the two Green Lanterns fighting off most of the OMACs and Brother Eye's defenses, the heroes' ship crashes into Brother Eye. Metamorpho provides an oxygen supply as Blue Beetle and Booster Gold stay with the ship to guard it, but Blue Beetle later assists in the destruction of the device that Brother Eye used to hide in orbit and the rescuing of some of the other heroes. Batman goes to distract Brother Eye by shutting off the central computer, although Brother Eye tries to distract him by showing him Nightwing's confrontation with Superboy-Prime. Sasha, linked to Oracle, goes to upload every computer virus on Earth into Brother Eye's system as well as trying to prevent the artificial gravity from shutting down. Black Canary goes to the surveillance room to use her sonic scream to blind the Eye. Black Lightning and Mr. Terrific go to the memory banks so that Black Lightning fries as much circuitry as possible while Mr. Terrific, invisible to machines and electronics, delivers the fatal blow by knocking Brother Eye off orbit using its orbital thrusters.

The plan works, and Brother Eye is deactivated. All of the remaining activated OMACs shut down, releasing their hosts. As all of the other heroes evacuate Brother Eye as it begins falling out of orbit to Earth, falling apart in the process, it tries to take Batman down with it, telling him he can never trust the costumed heroes again after what they did to him. Batman, however, says he will take his chances, and accepts Hal Jordan's aid in getting to safety.

After crash-landing in Saudi Arabia, Brother Eye tries to download its system into Sasha as a means of self-preservation, but Sasha manages to destroy the satellite, freeing herself from the nanobots infecting her.

DCU: A Brave New World 
DC released DCU: A Brave New World in June 2006, which was the epilogue to the OMAC limited series.

Brother Eye has not been fully decommissioned and lies in a NORAD facility. Michael Costner is the last OMAC unit, kept as emergency backup, and Brother Eye calls to him.

This Brother Eye has corrupted programming and now believes all humans need to be subjugated and/or exterminated, whether metahuman or not. It has also recently begun to manifest dissociative behavior with at least two "personalities" now being heard in the OMAC's internal conversations.

OMAC limited series (2006)

The 2006 OMAC limited series (not to be confused with the 2005 OMAC Project limited series) follows "the last OMAC" Michael Costner. Brother Eye attempts to make Costner rebuild itself, but is forced to face his wrath when Costner regains control of both his forms, human and OMAC, and subsequently destroys Brother Eye again; although a tiny fraction of it is still active.

Countdown to Final Crisis

A portion of Brother Eye was later retrieved and rebuilt by Buddy Blank, a former scientist from Wayne Industries. This portion meets with the time-traveling Karate Kid who is seeking a cure for the Morticoccus, a 31st-century illness that had evolved from the OMAC virus. Announcing that "the Great Disaster has come to me", Brother Eye directs him to Blüdhaven. Soon after, it reactivates its offensive protocols and assimilates the hangar it is being held in, turning the people within the hangar into new OMAC cyborgs. It then travels to the ruins of Blüdhaven and assimilates the city's infrastructure and the people within it using the Atomic Knights and Firestorm as power sources. Later, it activates a Boom Tube and travels to Apokolips, where it assimilates the entire planet and attempts to obtain the Morticoccus virus from Karate Kid, who has also been led there. It is forced to flee Apokolips when is attacked by the Pied Piper using the Anti-Life Equation.

Later, Brother Eye transforms Buddy Blank into a modified OMAC resembling Kirby's version of the character. Buddy uses this power to save himself and his grandson from starvation in the Command-D bunker beneath Blüdhaven. Brother Eye implies that it will contact Buddy again for a future need.

Batman and the Outsiders

A modified OMAC is shown as a part of the new Outsiders team in the 2008 Batman and the Outsiders series.

When a team from the Justice League attempts to seize a partially active OMAC, a leftover from The OMAC Project events, Batman takes the opportunity to reclaim it for himself—having Dr. Francine Langstrom (the long-suffering wife of Dr. Kirk Langstrom) create a clever forgery to leave in care of the League.

The OMAC, aptly renamed ReMAC, appears to be "an iPod with its tracklist wiped". Dr. Langstrom is unable to discern who ReMAC was before being infected by the OMAC virus; finding ReMAC a mere husk, devoid of any personal identity. This complete lack of personality makes ReMAC the perfect infiltrator, using its advanced shapeshifting abilities and its unquestioning obedience for the Outsiders' sake.

Since its lack of personality allows villains to snatch control of ReMAC, turning it into an enemy, Batman rigs up a telepresence system turning ReMAC into an advanced drone for Salah Miandad, Dr. Langstrom's chief assistant, enabling operation from the Outsiders HQ, the Batcave, or other secret locations.

While testing a new neural interface, less dependent from his stamina, to control the former OMAC, Salah is knocked into a coma. His mind comes to reside in ReMAC, supplanting the missing personality of the drone for a while (one full issue), until, due to the machinations of the villainous Simon Hurt, ReMAC is fed a malicious self-destruct code that blows it to pieces, making the restoration of Salah's consciousness impossible.

Final Crisis
In Final Crisis, Darkseid and his prophets from Apokolips have taken new forms as humans on Earth after mass-distributing the Anti-Life Equation around the world. Batman has been captured; Superman is on a journey in the multiverse; and Wonder Woman has become a Female Fury. With most of the world's population under the influence of the equation, they are effectively under Darkseid's control seemingly making him the ruler of the Earth.

In the one-shot Final Crisis: Resist, Mister Terrific and the Checkmate organization are working to mount a resistance against Darkseid, but seemingly do not have the means to do it. Sitting in despair in a Checkmate stronghold, Snapper Carr, through his hopeless rantings, gives Mister Terrific an ingenious idea. Using Sasha Bordeaux to make contact with Brother Eye, he convinces the A.I. to help them, explaining that it will surely be destroyed if Darkseid indeed captures the world.

Realizing this, Brother Eye accepts Mister Terrific's terms and reveals that there are still millions of people infected with OMAC nanotech. These people, now mindless drones of Darkseid, are overwritten by Brother Eye and become OMAC soldiers under the command of Mister Terrific. This gives Checkmate and him the means to forcefully resist Darkseid.

During the Final Crisis events when all seems lost, Lord (Brother) Eye prepares to leave the doomed Earth with his OMACs and the people of Command-D, the bunker underneath Blüdhaven, and start a new society on another Earth in another universe. To this end, he asks Renee Montoya to serve as the head of a to-be-founded Global Peacekeeping Agency, her faceless appearance as the Question being an allusion to the faceless agents of the GPA from the original OMAC series.

Generation Lost
In the Justice League: Generation Lost limited series, the resurrected Maxwell Lord controls the squad of OMACs attacking Jaime Reyes's home and his family. The old Justice League International arrives and takes Jaime's family to safety.

After Max escapes from the JLI, Booster Gold's partner, Skeets informs the JLI that he has the locations of the four formerly-dormant Checkmate cells which he had placed inside robotics laboratories that Max has been in contact with. The JLI travel to Chicago beneath the hidden robotics laboratory and learns that the OMAC variants were pure robots that are human/machine synthesis of the originals. Skeets scans the fingerprints of the robotics laboratory and discovers that Professor Ivo was here.

When Captain Atom absorbs the energy from Magog's spear, he is propelled forward through time 112 years in the future, where Max, while long dead, has plunged humanity into a massive metahuman war that is ruled by OMACs. Captain Atom battled for survival alongside the future versions of the Justice League, but they all are eventually contaminated by a new version of OMACs and one by one become OMACs themselves. Captain Atom is eventually returned to the present, but not before Batman (Damian Wayne) tells him how to stop Max's ultimate plans.

Afterward, Max gains new mental powers that can allow him to transform his targets into cadaver Black Lanterns, and then into OMACs after being fully restored to life. Max uses a device to enhance his new abilities, and he is able to turn people around the world into OMACs that attack Wonder Woman and the JLI. After this, Max sends his newest OMAC known as OMAC Prime, to which he had given both sentience and his voice, to attack Diana and the JLI. This new OMAC could assimilate the abilities of metahumans, in order to grow ever stronger with time, initially overwhelming the heroes it fought. During the final battle, Prime takes Blue Beetle's power, causing it to become nearly unstoppable, but Blue Beetle mentions to OMAC Prime that it cannot control the Scarab's power. Blue Beetle uses this to paralyze prime with crippling system failures before attacking and destroying OMAC Prime for good.

Possible Future
In Batman #700 (June 2010) in a vignette within the issue, Damian Wayne as Batman is shown having succeeded at what his father had failed to do: regaining control of Brother Eye.

Kevin Kho
In The New 52, a reboot of the DC Comics universe that launched in September 2011, a Cambodian-American man named Kevin Kho is introduced as the new O.M.A.C. and had worked as a genetic researcher at Project Cadmus. Maxwell Lord is revealed to have had a hand in Kevin's transformation.

The series was cancelled after running eight issues, due to DC's introduction of a "Second Wave" of new titles. Additionally, O.M.A.C. joined the Justice League International in the title's final issue.

During the "Forever Evil" storyline, the Crime Syndicate of America has captured Kevin Kho's O.M.A.C. form and is planning to use him as a weapon. Harley, who is working for the Thinker, takes O.M.A.C. and activates him causing him to fire a laser on the mountain which collapses on the two teams inside it. Harley arrives at Belle Reve and drops O.M.A.C. near James Gordon Jr. James Gordon Jr. also learns that the Thinker is planning to use O.M.A.C. While James Gordon Jr. is talking to Harley, the Thinker has taken O.M.A.C. and begins transferring his mind to it. Now activated, O.M.A.C. proceeds to attack Amanda Waller, James Gordon Jr., Harley Quinn, King Shark, and Kamo. King Shark begins to attack Kamo, until Amanda Waller is able to lie to both to get them to help her defeat OMAC. OMAC is fighting King Shark and Kamo while Amanda Waller attempts to activate Belle Reve's failsafe through the Thinker's computer. Before she is able to do so, Kevin Kho reaches out to her telling her he is trapped within OMAC. As Waller works with Kho, the team returns from the mountains, only to be dragged into the fight with OMAC. Having killed Kamo, OMAC is able to defeat Power Girl, Steel, Unknown Soldier, and King Shark and heads further into Belle Reve. Deadshot and Harley find "magic bullets" that will allow them to gain temporary superhuman powers. Deadshot fires them into Harley, Waller, himself, and Unknown Soldier and the Squad begins to attack OMAC. Kho is able to regain control of OMAC before Waller has to enact her last resort. But without knowing, Captain Boomerang knocks OMAC into a porthole, sending him to another dimension.

Kevin Kho returns in DC Rebirth in Blue Beetle. He is a friend of Jaime Reyes. After seeing monsters in the city, OMAC takes control of Kevin and begins fighting. Jaime convinces OMAC to help him against the real enemy and OMAC agrees.

Powers and abilities
Brother Eye can activate the virus in any infected person, at any time, within planetary range. Once activated, the person is covered in cybernetic armor and becomes a thrall to Brother Eye's commands.

An OMAC unit has access to archives on almost every metahuman on file, and can simulate countermeasures to the powers of a variety of superheroes and supervillains for the purpose of targeting the weaknesses of an opponent. Among the many inbuilt powers an OMAC drone possesses include flight, enhanced modular physicals pertaining to strength, speed, agility, reflexes, stamina, etc. and firing various energy beams from its facial/chest eye and hands with caustic, concussive, or blinding effects. In addition, the OMAC unit can metamorphose their nanobionic forms into various shapes and sizes; e.i. being able to change & alter extremities, its limbs into pincers and razor blades or even self generated cannonry, recombine upon and atop of one another to take on gigantic proportions as well as interface with technology using onboard micromachinery (regularly used amongst one another as a hive mind collective).

Said drones can also repurpose their microtech towards disabling and simulating the advanced technological capacities of other innovative creations, like the protective shielding of Themyscira.

Their main function is the application of nanotechnology in order to simulate the weaknesses of an opposing superpowered being whilst detaining and dispatching them. Such as shooting fire, project needles of artificial cellulose (against Alan Scott; an approximation of his weakness to wood), dispense flame-retarding foam, even once simulating Shazam's lightning power forcing Mary Marvel to revert to her human form. It can disable the Eradicator effortlessly. The only weakness an OMAC has is that it is human beneath its shell, intended as a deterrent to prevent heroes from using lethal force against them.

The OMACs are dependent on their assessment of individual heroes & villains. When fighting multiple opponents, they require a few seconds to adapt their countermeasures for each meta in question. Atom Smasher was able to stop an OMAC that was attacking the JSA by stomping it before it could assess his threat level. OMACs are also very vulnerable to Mister Terrific, as he cannot be detected by technology.

In the Superman/Batman series, Brainiac temporarily occupies a prototype OMAC drone to make use of its nanovirus.

ReMAC, the OMAC possessed by the Outsiders, has the same powers and abilities of a regular OMAC. He greatly differs in his physical makeup, being red in color and with a more human-like face even in his armored form.

Unable to contact Brother Eye and unable to access his former personality, ReMAC was controlled for a period by Dr. Salah Miandad. In this way, ReMAC retained his invulnerability and strength, but was limited by Salah's personal stamina and attention span, which was not always sufficient for a fight. Salah's mind was later trapped into the ReMAC body by a faulty mind interface, removing the limits of his below-average stamina.

A very powerful and extremely deadly new class of O.M.A.C's were designed and employed by Maxwell Lord using the various resources of Checkmate, Project's Cadmus & M, the Metal Men responsometer tech, Amazo's absorption cell engineering and the xenomachinery of a Reach Scarab to fashion an all robotic legion of automatons which were easier to OMACtivate and conduct their motions while using the JLI to search out his ultimate goal. The culmination of all the incorporated innovation's from the greatest technological advancements on Earth was O.M.A.C Prime.

A type of super android that could assess and exploit weaknesses, as well as implement psychological warfare using Max Lord's vocal patterns to offset his adversaries. Unlike other O.M.A.C's, Prime had the unique ability to mimic and combine the meta-abilities & utilities of other super types into itself, steadily making it stronger during battle through the acquisition of new powers and technology assimilated into itself via observational stimulus.

In other media

Television
 The Buddy Blank incarnation of OMAC and Brother Eye appear in Batman: The Brave and the Bold, voiced by Jeff Bennett and Dee Bradley Baker respectively.
 The OMAC concept and Brother Eye are alluded to in Arrow. In the episode "Corto Maltese", Ray Palmer inspects blueprints for an OMAC exo-suit, though by "The Climb", he changes the name to "A.T.O.M." In the episode "The Secret Origin of Felicity Smoak", a group of cyber terrorists referring to themselves as Brother Eye use a virus to attack Starling City and threaten to shut down all banks and set everyone on an even socioeconomic status. The eponymous Felicity Smoak is later revealed to have created the "Brother Eye Virus" years ago, with her then-boyfriend Cooper Seldon currently holding the name and leading the terrorist group.

Film
 The OMACs and Brother Eye would have been prominent antagonists under the leadership of Maxwell Lord and Talia in the abandoned project Justice League: Mortal.
 The OMACs and Brother Eye appear in Lego DC Batman: Family Matters, with the latter voiced by Cam Clarke.
 OMAC was intended to appear in a cancelled sequel to The Lego Batman Movie.

Video games
 The OMAC Project makes a cameo appearance in Batman's ending for Mortal Kombat vs. DC Universe. This version stands for Outerworld Monitor and Auto Containment and was designed by and to resemble Batman as a way to defend New Earth from multiversal invaders following the destruction of Dark Kahn (the merged form of Darkseid and Shao Kahn).
 Brother Eye and the OMAC Project appear in DC Universe Online, with the former voiced by Ken Thomas. Brainiac uses Brother Eye to take over Earth via its OMAC virus, a Defective OMAC, OMAC Drones, OMAC MK II, OMAC Nanosyths, OMAC Sigmas, OMAC Units, OMAC Delta, and an OMAC Incinerator.
 Brother Eye appears in Injustice 2, voiced by David Loefell. This version is a communications hub linking every satellite and server on Earth designed to warn of impending crime created by Batman after the toppling of Superman's Regime and is based in a new Batcave built in an old Gotham City subway system. Additionally, Brother Eye serves as the game's announcer and its satellite interface the main menu. In Multiverse Mode, Brother Eye is stated to have Source energy scanners, enabling it to search for threats across the multiverse. In the story mode, Brainiac takes over Brother Eye as part of his attack on Earth, but Cyborg hacks the latter, teaching it to ignore Brainiac and remove the alien's control.
 OMAC appears as a playable character in Lego DC Super-Villains.

References

DC Comics characters with superhuman strength
DC Comics supervillains
DC Comics supervillain teams
DC Comics cyborgs
DC Comics titles
2005 comics debuts
Characters created by Greg Rucka
Science fiction weapons